Differential dynamic programming (DDP) is an optimal control algorithm of the trajectory optimization class.  The algorithm was introduced in 1966 by Mayne and subsequently analysed in Jacobson and Mayne's eponymous book.  The algorithm uses locally-quadratic models of the dynamics and cost functions, and displays quadratic convergence. It is closely related to Pantoja's step-wise Newton's method.

Finite-horizon discrete-time problems 
The dynamics

describe the evolution of the state  given the control  from time  to time . The total cost  is the sum of running costs  and final cost , incurred when starting from state  and applying the control sequence  until the horizon is reached:

The solution of the optimal control problem is the minimizing control sequence

Trajectory optimization means finding  for a particular , rather than for all possible initial states.

Dynamic programming 

The optimal cost-to-go or value function at time  is the cost-to-go given the minimizing control sequence:

Setting , the dynamic programming principle reduces the minimization over an entire sequence of controls to a sequence of minimizations over a single control, proceeding backwards in time:

This is the Bellman equation.

Differential dynamic programming 
DDP proceeds by iteratively performing a backward pass on the nominal trajectory to generate a new control sequence, and then a forward-pass to compute and evaluate a new nominal trajectory. We begin with the backward pass. If

and expand to second order

The  notation used here is a variant of the notation of Morimoto where subscripts denote differentiation in denominator layout.

Dropping the index  for readability, primes denoting the next time-step  , the expansion coefficients are

The last terms in the last three equations denote contraction of a vector with a tensor. Minimizing the quadratic approximation  with respect to  we have

giving an open-loop term  and a feedback gain term . Plugging the result back into , we now have a quadratic model of the value at time :

Once the backward pass is completed, a forward pass computes a new trajectory:

The backward passes and forward passes are iterated until convergence.

Regularization and line-search 
Differential dynamic programming is a second-order algorithm like Newton's method. It therefore takes large steps toward the minimum and often requires regularization and/or line-search to achieve convergence

.

Monte Carlo version 
Sampled differential dynamic programming (SaDDP) is a Monte Carlo variant of differential dynamic programming. It is based on treating the quadratic cost of differential dynamic programming as the energy of a Boltzmann distribution. This way the quantities of DDP can be matched to the statistics of a multidimensional normal distribution. The statistics can be recomputed from sampled trajectories without differentiation.

Sampled differential dynamic programming has been extended to Path Integral Policy Improvement with Differential Dynamic Programming. This creates a link between differential dynamic programming and path integral control, which is a framework of stochastic optimal control.

Constrained problems 
Interior Point Differential dynamic programming (IPDDP) is an interior-point method generalization of DDP that can address the optimal control problem with nonlinear state and input constraints.

See also 
 Optimal control

References

External links 
 A Python implementation of DDP
 A MATLAB implementation of DDP

Dynamic programming